A Book on Nymphs, Sylphs, Pygmies, and Salamanders, and on the Other Spirits is a treatise by the Swiss lay theologian and philosopher Paracelsus, published posthumously in 1566. It is about elemental beings and their place in a Christian cosmology.

Background

A Book on Nymphs, Sylphs, Pygmies, and Salamanders, and on the Other Spirits was written by Paracelsus (1493/1494 – 1541) late in his life, but it is not known what exact year it is from. The descriptions of elemental beings are based on various ancient and traditional sources, which the author adapted and reinterpreted.

Summary
Paracelsus argues from his reading of the Biblical creation narrative that man needs to use philosophy to gain knowledge about the natural world, or he will not be able to understand Christ and appreciate the Bible. The natural world contains many strange things, including elemental beings corresponding to the four classical elements: nymphs (water), sylphs (air), pygmies (earth) and salamanders (fire). He dismisses the conventional Christian view that elemental beings are devils, instead arguing that they are significant parts of God's creation, and studies them like he studied the rest of the natural world.

Publication
Like Paracelsus' other theological works, A Book on Nymphs was published posthumously, first appearing as a separate print in 1566 and the year after in a collection of the author's philosophical writings. After that it has appeared in a number of collections of Paracelsus' works. An English translation by Henry E. Sigherist appears in Four Treatises of Theophrastus von Hohenheim Called Paracelsus, published by Johns Hopkins University Press in 1941 and republished in 1996.

Legacy
The fairy-tale like quality of the treatise has made it a popular source of inspiration for poets and fiction writers. It was the main source for the descriptions of elementals in the 1670 work Comte de Gabalis, which in turn has influenced writers such as Alexander Pope, Friedrich de la Motte Fouqué, Charles Baudelaire and Anatole France. The dramatist Jean Giraudoux explicitly states his debt to Paracelsus in the preface to his 1938 play Ondine.

References

Citations

Sources

 
 
 
 
 

1566 books
Paracelsus
Christian theology books
Christian cosmology
Elementals
Works based on European myths and legends
Literature of the German Renaissance
16th-century Latin books
Books published posthumously